The Battle of Chamdo (or Qamdo) occurred from 6 to 24 October 1950. It was a military campaign by the People's Republic of China (PRC) to take the Chamdo Region from a de facto independent Tibetan state. The campaign resulted in the capture of Chamdo and the annexation of Tibet by the People's Republic of China.

Background 

Kham was a border region of Tibet. Prior to the establishment of the PRC, it roughly coincided with the Sikang Province under Kuomintang-led Republic of China. Its western half is known as Chamdo.

The Khampa Tibetans and Lhasa Tibetans held each other in mutual contempt and dislike, with the Khampas in some cases hating Lhasa rule even more than Chinese rule, which was why the Khampas did little to resist Chinese forces as they entered eastern Kham and subsequently took over the whole of Tibet. Likewise, the Qinghai (Amdo) Tibetans view the Tibetans of Central Tibet (Tibet proper, ruled by the Dalai Lamas from Lhasa) as different from themselves and even take pride in the fact that they were not ruled by Lhasa ever since the collapse of the Tibetan Empire.

Khampas like the Pandatsang clan had led rebellions for autonomy from Lhasa. Because of this, the Chinese communists viewed them as potential revolutionary allies. In January 1950, the communists officially proposed to aid the Pandatsang brothers' cause in exchange for them to stay on the sidelines during the "liberation of Tibet", but the Pandatsang brothers decided instead to send George Patterson to India to seek alternate aid. Pandatsang Rapga, leader of the pro-Kuomintang Tibet Improvement Party also offered the Lhasa-appointed governor of Chamdo, Ngabo Ngawang Jigme, some Khampa fighters in exchange for the Tibetan government recognizing the local independence of Kham. Ngabo refused the offer.

Negotiations with Lhasa 
On 7 March 1950, a Tibetan government delegation arrived in Kalimpong to open a dialogue with the newly declared People's Republic of China and aimed to secure assurances that it would respect Tibet's territorial integrity, among other things. The dialogue was delayed by a debate between the Tibetan, Indian, British and the PRC delegation over the location of the talks.

The Tibetan delegation eventually met with the PRC’s ambassador General Yuan Zhongxian in Delhi on 16 September 1950. Yuan communicated a three-point claimed proposal that Tibet be regarded as part of China, that China be responsible for Tibet’s defense, and that China was responsible for Tibet’s trade and foreign relations. Refusal would result in conquest by China. The Tibetans undertook to maintain the relationship between China and Tibet as one of preceptor and patron, and their head delegate, Tsepon W. D. Shakabpa, on 19 September, recommended cooperation (but with some stipulations about implementation). Chinese troops need not be stationed in Tibet, it was argued, since it was under no threat, and if attacked by India or Nepal could appeal to China for military assistance.

Invasion of Eastern Kham 

After the defeat of major Kuomintang forces in the Chinese Civil War, the People's Liberation Army (PLA) turned its attention to the Republic of China territories in the hinterland. Eastern Kham was the Chinese-held part of Sikang and the gateway to Tibetan areas. The 18th Army of the PLA formed the leading detachment advancing toward Tibet with the 52nd Division as its main force, and arrived at Ya'an on 12 February 1950. In March, the People's Liberation Army arrived in Kangding (Tachienlu). By mid-April, the 18th Army had at least 30,000 passing through Kangding, and 10,000 Tibetans helped to build the road from Kangding to Garzê (Kandze), which was completed in August. The 18th Army of the PLA assembled at Garzê on 30 July, headquartered at Xinlong, and entered Litang from the east. The Qinghai Cavalry Detachment entered Gyêgu on 22 July, forming a north-south pincer on Chamdo.

In June 1950, the PLA and the Tibetan army fought for the first time in Dengke. Dengke is located beside the main road from Garzê to Yushu, about 100 miles northeast of Chamdo. Former Chamdo governor Lhalu Tsewang Dorje had set up a radio station there. The People's Liberation Army traced the source of the radio signals and launched a raid across the Jinsha River and destroyed the radio station. Two weeks later (July), 800 Khampa militia (including 300 monks) raided Dengke, and killed 600 PLA soldiers. In the end, the PLA succeeded in occupying eastern Kham.

Battle of Chamdo 
After months of failed negotiations, attempts by Lhasa to secure foreign support and assistance, and the troop buildups by the PRC and Tibet, the PLA crossed the Jinsha River on 6 or 7 October 1950 into Lhasa-controlled Chamdo, crossing the de facto border at five places.

Two PLA units quickly captured the border town of Chamdo by 19 October, by which time 114 PLA soldiers and 180 Tibetan soldiers had been killed or wounded. The Chamdo governor and commander of Tibetan forces, Ngabo Ngawang Jigme, surrendered with his 2,700 men. Writing in 1962, Zhang Guohua claimed "5738 enemy troops "liquidated" and over 5700 "destroyed", and "more than 3,000" peacefully surrendered. Active hostilities were limited to a border area controlled by Lhasa northeast of the Salween River and east of the 96th meridian.

According to the Dalai Lama, the PLA did not attack civilians.

With the capture of Chamdo, the PLA believed the objective to have been reached, unilaterally ceased hostilities, and sent Ngabo to Lhasa to reiterate terms of negotiation, and waited for Tibetan representatives to respond through delegates to Beijing.

On 21 October, Lhasa instructed its delegation to leave immediately for Beijing for consultations with the PRC government, and to accept the first provision if the status of the Dalai Lama could be guaranteed, while rejecting the other two conditions. It later rescinded even acceptance of the first demand, after a divination before the Six-Armed Mahākāla deities indicated that the three points could not be accepted, since Tibet would fall under foreign domination.

On 24 October, all military operations ended.

Aftermath 

After news of the defeat at the Battle of Chamdo reached Lhasa, Regent Ngawang Sungrab Thutob stepped down, and the 14th Dalai Lama was enthroned ahead of plans. In February 1951, five plenipotentiaries from Tibet were sent to Beijing to negotiate with the PRC government, led by chief representative Ngabo. In late April 1951, the Tibetan Kashag delegation went to Beijing to conclude peace talks, again led by Ngabo, who would go on to serve in the high ranks of the PLA and PRC government. The Seventeen Point Agreement was eventually signed between the Chinese and the Tibetans.

After releasing the captured, Chinese broadcasts promised that if Tibet was "peacefully liberated", the Tibetan elites would not be denied their positions and power.

Some Khampa fighters continued their opposition. Local warlords later became united under a common objective and hence resulted in the formation of Chushi Gangdruk with assistance from the CIA.

According to contemporary author Melvyn Goldstein, the campaign aimed to capture the Lhasa army occupying Chamdo, demoralize the Lhasa government, and to exert pressure to get Tibetan representatives to agree to negotiations in Beijing and sign terms recognizing China's sovereignty over Tibet.

See also 

 Annexation of Tibet by the People's Republic of China
 British expedition to Tibet (1903–1904)
 Chinese expedition to Tibet (1910)
 Tibet (1912–1951)
 Sino-Tibetan War (1930–1932)
 Qinghai–Tibet War (1932)
 History of Tibet (1950–present)
 Seventeen Point Agreement (1951)
 List of wars involving the People's Republic of China (1949–)

References

Citations

Sources 

 Feigon, Lee. Demystifying Tibet: Unlocking the Secrets of the Land of Snows (1996) Ivan R. Dee Inc. .
 Ford, Robert. Wind Between The Worlds The extraordinary first-person account of a Westerner's life in Tibet as an official of the Dalai Lama (1957) David Mckay Co., Inc.
 Goldstein, Melvyn C. A History of Modern Tibet, Volume 1: 1913–1951: The Demise of the Lamaist State (1989) University of California Press. .
 Goldstein, Melvyn C. A History of Modern Tibet, Volume 2: The Calm Before the Storm 1951–1955 (2007) University of California Press. .
 Goldstein, Melvyn C. The Snow Lion and the Dragon: China, Tibet, and the Dalai Lama (1997) University of California Press. .
 Grunfeld, A. Tom. The Making of Modern Tibet (1996) East Gate Book. .
 Knaus, Robert Kenneth. Orphans of the Cold War: America and the Tibetan Struggle for Survival (1999) PublicAffairs . .
 Laird, Thomas. The Story of Tibet: Conversations with the Dalai Lama (2006) Grove Press. .
 Shakya, Tsering. The Dragon In The Land Of Snows (1999) Columbia University Press. .
 Robert W. Ford Captured in Tibet, Oxford University Press, 1990, .

Conflicts in 1950
Annexation of Tibet by the People's Republic of China
Military history of Tibet
Wars involving the People's Republic of China
1950 in Tibet
Chamdo
Invasions of Tibet
Invasions by China
1950 in China